Cymindis lindbergi is a species of ground beetle in the subfamily Harpalinae. It was described by Mateu in 1956.

References

lindbergi
Beetles described in 1956